Gennevilliers is a commune in the northwestern suburbs of Paris, in the Hauts-de-Seine department of Île-de-France. In 2017, it had a population of 46,907.

History

On 9 April 1929, one-fifth of the territory of Gennevilliers was detached and became the commune of Villeneuve-la-Garenne. Gennevilliers is the site of the main river port Port of Gennevilliers of Paris on the Seine.

Population

Transport
Gennevilliers is served by three stations on Paris Métro Line 13: Les Courtilles, Les Agnettes and Gabriel Péri. All three are at the border with the commune of Asnières-sur-Seine.

Gennevilliers is also served by two stations on RER C (Les Grésillons and Gennevilliers), as well as five stops on Île-de-France tramway Line 1.

Education
Schools in Gennevilliers include:
13 preschools
9 primary schools
3 junior high schools: Collège Guy-Môquet, Collège Édouard-Vaillant, Collège Louis-Pasteur

There is a senior high school, Lycée Galilée.

Natives/residents 
Isabelle Adjani, actress
Pascal Tayot, French judoka who won a silver medal at the 1992 Summer Olympics 
Thierry Vigneron, pole vault bronze medalist and former record holder 
Garra Dembélé, footballer
Wesley Jobello, footballer
David N'Gog, footballer (Bolton Wanderers, Liverpool F.C.)
Édouard Roger-Vasselin, tennis player
Jeanine Claes, dancer

Twin towns – sister cities

Gennevilliers is twinned with:

 La Bañeza, Spain
 Bergkamen, Germany
 Al-Bireh, Palestine
 Imola, Italy
 Ostrowiec Świętokrzyski, Poland
 Wirral, England, United Kingdom

See also
Communes of the Hauts-de-Seine department

References

External links

 Official website

Communes of Hauts-de-Seine